

Events

Pre-1600
 312 – Constantine is said to have received his famous Vision of the Cross.
 1275 – Traditional founding of the city of Amsterdam.
 1524 – French troops lay siege to Pavia.
 1553 – Condemned as a heretic, Michael Servetus is burned at the stake just outside Geneva.

1601–1900
 1644 – Second Battle of Newbury in the English Civil War.
 1682 – Philadelphia is founded in the Commonwealth of Pennsylvania.
 1775 – King George III expands on his Proclamation of Rebellion in the Thirteen Colonies in his speech from the throne at the opening of Parliament.
 1795 – The United States and Spain sign the Treaty of Madrid, which establishes the boundaries between Spanish colonies and the U.S.
 1806 – The French Army under Napoleon enters Berlin following the Prussian defeat at the Battle of Jena–Auerstedt.
 1810 – United States annexes the former Spanish colony of West Florida.
 1838 – Missouri governor Lilburn Boggs issues the Extermination Order, which orders all Mormons to leave the state or be killed.
 1870 – Franco-Prussian War: Marshal Bazaine surrenders to Prussian forces at the conclusion of the Siege of Metz along with 140,000 French soldiers.

1901–present
 1904 – The first underground New York City Subway line opens, later designated as the IRT Broadway–Seventh Avenue Line.
 1907 – Fifteen people are killed in Hungary when gendarmes opened fire on a crowd gathered at a church consecration.
 1914 – World War I: The new British battleship HMS Audacious is sunk by a minefield laid by the armed German merchant-cruiser Berlin.
 1916 – Negus Mikael, marching on the Ethiopian capital in support of his son Emperor Iyasu V, is defeated by Fitawrari abte Giyorgis, securing the throne for Empress Zewditu I.
 1919 – The Fourth Regional Congress of Peasants, Workers and Insurgents is held by the Makhnovshchina at Oleksandrivsk.
 1922 – A referendum in Rhodesia rejects the country's annexation to the South African Union.
 1924 – The Uzbek SSR is founded in the Soviet Union.
 1930 – Ratifications exchanged in London for the first London Naval Treaty go into effect immediately, further limiting the expensive naval arms race among its five signatories.
 1936 – Mrs Wallis Simpson obtains her divorce, which would eventually allow her to marry King Edward VIII of the United Kingdom, thus forcing his abdication from the throne.
 1944 – World War II: German forces capture Banská Bystrica during Slovak National Uprising thus bringing it to an end.
 1954 – Benjamin O. Davis, Jr. becomes the first African-American general in the United States Air Force.
 1958 – Iskander Mirza, the first President of Pakistan, is deposed by General Ayub Khan, who had been appointed the enforcer of martial law by Mirza 20 days earlier.
 1961 – NASA tests the first Saturn I rocket in Mission Saturn-Apollo 1.
 1962 – Major Rudolf Anderson of the United States Air Force becomes the only direct human casualty of the Cuban Missile Crisis when his U-2 reconnaissance airplane is shot down over Cuba by a Soviet-supplied surface-to-air missile.
  1962   – By refusing to agree to the firing of a nuclear torpedo at a US warship, Vasily Arkhipov averts nuclear war.
 1964 – Ronald Reagan delivers a speech on behalf of the Republican candidate for president, Barry Goldwater. The speech launches his political career and comes to be known as "A Time for Choosing".
 1967 – Catholic priest Philip Berrigan and others of the 'Baltimore Four' protest the Vietnam War by pouring blood on Selective Service records.
 1971 – The Democratic Republic of the Congo is renamed Zaire.
 1979 – Saint Vincent and the Grenadines gains its independence from the United Kingdom.
 1981 – Cold War: The  runs aground on the east coast of Sweden.
 1986 – The British government suddenly deregulates financial markets, leading to a total restructuring of the way in which they operate in the country, in an event now referred to as the Big Bang.
 1988 – Cold War: Ronald Reagan suspends construction of the new U.S. Embassy in Moscow due to Soviet listening devices in the building structure.
 1991 – Turkmenistan achieves independence from the Soviet Union.
 1992 – United States Navy radioman Allen R. Schindler, Jr. is murdered by shipmate Terry M. Helvey for being gay, precipitating debate about gays in the military that results in the United States' "Don't ask, don't tell" military policy.
 1994 – Gliese 229B is the first Substellar Mass Object to be unquestionably identified.
 1995 – Former Prime Minister of Italy Bettino Craxi is convicted in absentia of corruption.
 1997 – The 1997 Asian financial crisis causes a crash in the Dow Jones Industrial Average.
 1999 – Gunmen open fire in the Armenian Parliament, killing the Prime Minister and seven others.
 2014 – Britain withdraws from Afghanistan at the end of Operation Herrick, after 12 years four months and seven days.
 2017 – Catalonia declares independence from Spain. 
 2018 – A gunman opens fire on a Pittsburgh synagogue killing 11 and injuring six, including four police officers.
  2018   – Leicester City F.C. owner Vichai Srivaddhanaprabha dies in a helicopter crash along with four others after a Premier League match against West Ham United at the King Power Stadium in Leicester, England.
 2019 – Islamic State of Iraq and the Levant founder and leader Abu Bakr al-Baghdadi kills himself and three children by detonating a suicide vest during the U.S. military Barisha raid in northwestern Syria.

Births

Pre-1600
 892 – Emperor Ai of Tang, Chinese emperor (d. 908)
 921 – Chai Rong, Chinese emperor (d. 959)
 1156 – Raymond VI, Count of Toulouse (d. 1222)
 1335 – Taejo of Joseon (d. 1408)
 1401 – Catherine of Valois (d. 1437)
 1561 – Mary Sidney, English writer, patroness and translator (d. 1621)
 1572 – Marie Elisabeth of France, French princess (d. 1578)

1601–1900
 1615 – Christian I, Duke of Saxe-Merseburg, (d. 1691)
 1661 – Fyodor Apraksin, Russian admiral (d. 1728)
 1703 – Johann Gottlieb Graun, German violinist and composer (d. 1771)
 1744 – Mary Moser, English painter and academic (d. 1819)
 1760 – August Neidhardt von Gneisenau, Prussian field marshal (d. 1831)
 1765 – Nancy Storace, English soprano (d. 1817)
 1782 – Niccolò Paganini, Italian violinist and composer (d. 1840)
 1806 – Juan Seguín, American colonel, judge, and politician, 101st Mayor of San Antonio (d. 1890)
 1811 – Stevens T. Mason, American lawyer and politician, 1st Governor of Michigan (d. 1843)
  1811   – Isaac Singer, American actor and businessman, founded the Singer Corporation (d. 1875)
 1814 – Daniel H. Wells, American religious leader and politician, 3rd Mayor of Salt Lake City (d. 1891)
 1838 – John Davis Long, American lawyer and politician, 34th United States Secretary of the Navy (d. 1915)
 1842 – Giovanni Giolitti, Italian politician, 13th Prime Minister of Italy (d. 1928)
 1844 – Klas Pontus Arnoldson, Swedish journalist and politician, Nobel Prize laureate (d. 1916)
 1854 – William Alexander Smith, Scottish religious leader, founded the Boys' Brigade (d. 1914)
 1858 – Elliott Lewis, Australian politician, 19th Premier of Tasmania (d. 1935)
  1858   – Saitō Makoto, Japanese admiral and politician, 30th Prime Minister of Japan (d. 1936)
  1858   – Theodore Roosevelt, American colonel and politician, 26th President of the United States, Nobel Prize laureate (d. 1919)
 1865 – Charles Spencelayh, English painter and academic (d. 1958)
 1868 – William Gillies, Australian politician, 21st Premier of Queensland (d. 1928)
 1877 – Walt Kuhn, American painter and academic (d. 1949)
  1877   – George Thompson, English cricketer and umpire (d. 1943)
 1884 – Shirō Takasu, Japanese admiral (d. 1944)
 1885 – Sigrid Hjertén, Swedish painter (d. 1948)
 1890 – Toshinari Shōji, Japanese general (d. 1974)
 1894 – Agda Helin, Swedish actress (d. 1984) 
  1894   – Oliver Leese, English-Welsh general (d. 1978)
  1894   – Fritz Sauckel, German sailor and politician (d. 1946)

1901–present
 1904 – Riho Lahi, Estonian journalist and author (d. 1995)
 1906 – Peter Blume, Belarusian-American painter and sculptor (d. 1992)
  1906   – Earle Cabell, American banker and politician, Mayor of Dallas (d. 1975)
  1906   – Kazuo Ohno, Japanese dancer and educator (d. 2010)
 1908 – Lee Krasner, American painter (d. 1984)
 1910 – Jack Carson, Canadian-American actor and singer (d. 1963)
  1910   – Margaret Hutchinson Rousseau, American chemical engineer (d. 2000)
 1913 – Joe Medicine Crow, American anthropologist, historian, and author (d. 2016)
  1913   – Luigi Piotti, Italian race car driver (d. 1971)
 1914 – Ahmet Kireççi, Turkish wrestler (d. 1979)
  1914   – Dylan Thomas, Welsh poet and playwright (d. 1953)
 1915 – Harry Saltzman, Canadian-French production manager and producer (d. 1994)
 1917 – Augustine Harris, English bishop (d. 2007)
  1917   – Oliver Tambo, South African lawyer and politician (d. 1993)
 1918 – Mihkel Mathiesen, Estonian engineer and politician (d. 2003)
  1918   – Teresa Wright, American actress and singer (d. 2005)
 1920 – Nanette Fabray, American actress, singer, and dancer (d. 2018)
  1920   – K. R. Narayanan, Indian lawyer and politician, 10th President of India (d. 2005)
 1921 – Warren Allen Smith, American journalist, author, and activist (d. 2017)
 1922 – Poul Bundgaard, Danish actor and singer (d. 1998)
  1922   – Ruby Dee, American actress and poet (d. 2014)
  1922   – Michel Galabru, French actor and playwright (d. 2016) 
  1922   – Ralph Kiner, American baseball player and sportscaster (d. 2014)
 1923 – Roy Lichtenstein, American painter and sculptor (d. 1997)
  1923   – Ned Wertimer, American actor (d. 2013)
 1924 – Bonnie Lou, American singer-songwriter (d. 2015)
 1925 – Warren Christopher, American soldier, lawyer, and politician, 63rd United States Secretary of State (d. 2011)
  1925   – Jane Connell, American actress and singer (d. 2013)
  1925   – Paul Fox, English broadcaster
  1925   – Monica Sims, English radio host and producer (d. 2018)
 1926 – Boris Chetkov, Russian painter (d. 2010)
  1926   – Henri Fertet, French Resistance fighter (d. 1943)
  1926   – H. R. Haldeman,  American businessman and diplomat, 4th White House Chief of Staff (d. 1993)
  1926   – Takumi Shibano, Japanese author and translator (d. 2010)
 1927 – Dominick Argento, American composer and educator (d. 2019)
 1928 – Gilles Vigneault, Canadian singer-songwriter and poet
 1929 – Myra Carter, American actress (d. 2016)
  1929   – Bill George, American football player (d. 1982)
  1929   – Maurice Robert Johnston, English general and politician, Lord Lieutenant of Wiltshire
 1930 – Leo Baxendale, English cartoonist (d. 2017)
  1930   – Barry Supple, English historian and academic
 1931 – Nawal El Saadawi, Egyptian physician, psychiatrist, and author (d. 2021)
  1931   – Anatoliy Zayaev, Ukrainian footballer and manager (d. 2012)
 1932 – Jean-Pierre Cassel, French actor (d. 2007)
  1932   – Harry Gregg, Northern Irish footballer and manager (d. 2020)
  1932   – Dolores Moore, American baseball player (d. 2000)
  1932   – Sylvia Plath, American poet, novelist, and short story writer (d. 1963)
 1933 – Floyd Cramer, American singer and pianist (d. 1997)
  1933   – Ryō Hanmura, Japanese author (d. 2002)
 1934 – Giorgos Konstantinou, Greek actor, director, and screenwriter
 1935 – Maurício de Sousa, Brazilian journalist and cartoonist
  1935   – Charlie Tagawa, Japanese-American banjo player and educator (d. 2017)
 1936 – Neil Sheehan, American journalist and author
 1938 – Lara Parker, American actress and author
 1939 – John Cleese, English actor, comedian, screenwriter and producer
  1939   – Suzy Covey, American scholar and academic (d. 2007)
  1939   – Dallas Frazier, American country music singer-songwriter (d. 2022)
 1940 – John Gotti, American mob boss (d. 2002)
  1940   – Maxine Hong Kingston, American author and academic
 1941 – Dave Costa, American football player (d. 2013)
  1941   – Warren Ryan, Australian rugby league player, coach, and sportscaster
  1941   – Dick Trickle, American race car driver (d. 2013)
 1942 – Lee Greenwood, American singer-songwriter
  1942   – Janusz Korwin-Mikke, Polish journalist and politician
 1943 – Carmen Argenziano, American actor and producer (d. 2019)
  1943   – Jerry Rook, American basketball player and coach
 1944 – J. A. Jance, American author and poet
 1945 – Arild Andersen, Norwegian bassist and composer 
  1945   – Luiz Inácio Lula da Silva, Brazilian union leader and politician, 35th President of Brazil
  1945   – Carrie Snodgress, American actress (d. 2004)
 1946 – Peter Martins, Danish dancer and choreographer
  1946   – Steven R. Nagel, American colonel, engineer, and astronaut (d. 2014)
  1946   – Ivan Reitman, Slovak-Canadian actor, director, and producer (d. 2022)
 1948 – Kevin Borich, New Zealand-Australian guitarist and songwriter
 1949 – Garry Tallent, American bass player and record producer 
 1950 – Michael Driscoll, English economist and academic
  1950   – Fran Lebowitz, American author 
  1950   – Július Šupler, Slovak ice hockey player and coach
  1950   – A. N. Wilson, English journalist, historian, and author
 1951 – K. K. Downing, English guitarist and songwriter 
  1951   – Carlos Frenk, Mexican-English physicist, cosmologist, and academic
  1951   – Nancy Jacobs, American politician
  1951   – Jayne Kennedy, American model, actress, and sportscaster
 1952 – Roberto Benigni, Italian actor, director, and screenwriter
  1952   – Francis Fukuyama, American political scientist, economist, and author
  1952   – Atsuyoshi Furuta, Japanese footballer
  1952   – Topi Sorsakoski, Finnish singer-songwriter (d. 2011)
 1953 – Peter Firth, English actor
  1953   – Robert Picardo, American actor, director, and screenwriter
 1954 – Jan Duursema, American illustrator
  1954   – Mike Kelley, American artist and musician (d. 2012)
  1954   – Chris Tavaré, English cricketer and biologist
 1955 – Debra Bowen, American lawyer and politician, 31st Secretary of State of California
 1956 – Patty Sheehan, American golfer
  1956   – Babis Tsertos, Greek singer-songwriter and bouzouki player
 1957 – Glenn Hoddle, English footballer and manager
  1957   – Peter Marc Jacobson, American actor, director, and producer
 1958 – Gordon Cowans, English footballer
  1958   – David Hazeltine, American pianist and composer
  1958   – Simon Le Bon, English singer-songwriter
  1958   – Jonathan Shapiro, South African political cartoonist who uses the pseudonym Zapiro
  1958   – Felix Wurman, American cellist and composer (d. 2009)
 1959 – Rick Carlisle, American basketball player and coach
 1960 – Tom Nieto, American baseball player, coach, and manager
 1963 – David Hall, Australian horse trainer
  1963   – Marla Maples, American model and actress
  1963   – Tom McKean, Scottish runner
 1964 – Mary T. Meagher, American swimmer
  1964   – Mark Taylor, Australian cricketer and sportscaster
  1964   – Ian Wells, English footballer (d. 2013)
 1965 – Mohan Kapoor, Indian television and film actor
 1966 – Steve Almond, American author and educator
  1966   – Kit Malthouse, English accountant and politician
  1966   – Hege Nerland, Norwegian lawyer and politician (d. 2007)
  1966   – Masanobu Takashima, Japanese actor
 1967 – Simone Moro, Italian mountaineer and pilot
  1967   – Dejan Raičković, Montenegrin footballer and manager
  1967   – Scott Weiland, American singer-songwriter (d. 2015)
 1968 – Dileep, Indian actor and producer
  1968   – Alain Auderset, Swiss author and illustrator
  1968   – Vinny Samways, English footballer and manager
 1969 – Marek Napiórkowski, Polish jazz guitarist and composer
  1969   – Michael Tarnat, German footballer 
 1970 – Karl Backman, Swedish guitarist and songwriter 
  1970   – Felix Bwalya, Zambian boxer (d. 1997)
  1970   – Adrian Erlandsson, Swedish drummer 
  1970   – Jonathan Stroud, English author
  1970   – Ruslana Taran, Ukrainian sailor
 1971 – Stefano Guidoni, Italian footballer
  1971   – Jorge Soto, Peruvian footballer
  1971   – Theodoros Zagorakis, Greek footballer and politician
 1972 – Lee Clark, English footballer and manager
  1972   – Elissa, Lebanese singer
  1972   – Evan Coyne Maloney, American director, producer, and screenwriter
  1972   – Maria Mutola, Mozambican runner and coach
  1972   – Brad Radke, American baseball player
 1973 – Jason Johnson, American baseball player
  1973   – Semmy Schilt, Dutch kick-boxer and mixed martial artist
 1975 – Nicola Mazzucato, Italian rugby player and coach
  1975   – Aron Ralston, American mountaineer and engineer
 1976 – Bobby Fish, American professional wrestler
  1976   – Maneet Chauhan, Indian-American chef and author
  1976   – Wilson Raimundo Júnior, Brazilian footballer
 1977 – Jiří Jarošík, Czech footballer
  1977   – Sheeri Rappaport, American actress
  1977   – Kumar Sangakkara, Sri Lankan cricketer
 1978 – Sergei Samsonov, Russian ice hockey player and scout
  1978   – Vanessa-Mae, Singaporean-English violinist and skier
 1979 – Hiroyuki Yamamoto, Japanese footballer
 1980 – Sayuri Osuga, Japanese speed skater and cyclist
  1980   – Tanel Padar, Estonian singer-songwriter and guitarist
  1980   – Henriett Seth F., Hungarian autistic savant artist and author
 1981 – Salem Al Fakir, Swedish singer and keyboard player
  1981   – Sririta Jensen, Thai actress and model
  1981   – Volkan Demirel, Turkish footballer
  1981   – Kristi Richards, Canadian skier
 1982 – Patrick Fugit, American actor and producer
  1982   – Takashi Tsukamoto, Japanese actor and singer
 1983 – Brent Clevlen, American baseball player
  1983   – Takuro Okuyama, Japanese footballer
  1983   – Martín Prado, Venezuelan baseball player
  1984   – Yi Jianlian, Chinese basketball player
  1984   – Kostas Kapetanos, Greek footballer
  1984   – Kelly Osbourne, English television personality
  1984   – Brady Quinn, American football player
  1984   – Emilie Ullerup, Danish-Canadian actress
 1985 – Sirli Hanni, Estonian biathlete
  1985   – Sandra Volk, Slovenian tennis player
 1986 – Jon Niese, American baseball player
  1986   – Matty Pattison, South African-English footballer
  1986   – David Warner, Australian cricketer
 1987 – Thelma Aoyama, Japanese singer
  1987   – Björn Barrefors, Swedish decathlete and heptathlete
  1987   – Andrew Bynum, American basketball player
  1987   – Guillaume Franke, French-German rugby player
 1988 – Brady Ellison, American archer 
  1988   – Viktor Genev, Bulgarian footballer
  1988   – Illimar Pärn, Estonian ski jumper
  1988   – Evan Turner, American basketball player
 1989 – Mark Barron, American football player
 1990 – Dimitrios Gkourtsas, Greek footballer
  1990   – Oktovianus Maniani, Indonesian footballer
 1991 – Shohei Takahashi, Japanese footballer
 1992 – Stephan El Shaarawy, Italian footballer
  1992   – Emily Hagins, American director, producer, and screenwriter
  1992   – Brandon Saad, American ice hockey player
  1992   – Daniel Sams, Australian cricketer
 1993 – Kiefer Ravena, Filipino basketball player
 1996 – Kim Woo-seok, South Korean singer and actor
 1997 – Lonzo Ball, American basketball player
  1997   – James TW, English singer-songwriter
 1999 – Haruka Kudo, Japanese singer and actress

Deaths

Pre-1600
 939 – Æthelstan, English king
 1052 – Qirwash ibn al-Muqallad, Uqaylid emir
 1269 – Ulrich III, Duke of Carinthia (b. c.1220)
 1272 – Hugh IV, Duke of Burgundy (b. 1213)
 1277 – Walter de Merton, Lord Chancellor of England
 1303 – Beatrice of Castile, wife of King Afonso III of Portugal
 1312 – John II, Duke of Brabant (b. 1275)
 1326 – Hugh le Despenser, 1st Earl of Winchester (b. 1262)
 1327 – Elizabeth de Burgh, queen of Robert the Bruce
 1329 – Mahaut, Countess of Artois (b. 1268)
 1331 – Abulfeda, Arab historian and geographer (b. 1273)
 1430 – Vytautas, Lithuanian ruler (b. 1350)
 1439 – Albert II of Germany (b. 1397)
 1441 – Margery Jourdemayne, executed for treasonable witchcraft
 1449 – Ulugh Beg, Persian astronomer, mathematician and sultan (b. 1394)
 1485 – Rodolphus Agricola, Dutch philosopher, poet and educator (b. 1443)
 1505 – Ivan III of Russia (b. 1440)
 1513 – George Manners, 11th Baron de Ros, English nobleman
 1553 – Michael Servetus, Spanish physician and theologian (b. 1511)
 1561 – Lope de Aguirre, Spanish explorer (b. 1510)
 1573 – Laurentius Petri, Swedish archbishop (b. 1499)

1601–1900
 1605 – Akbar, Mughal emperor (b. 1542)
 1613 – Gabriel Báthory, Prince of Transylvania (b. 1589)
 1617 – Ralph Winwood, English lawyer and politician, English Secretary of State (b. 1563)
 1666 – Robert Hubert, French watchmaker (b. 1640)
 1670 – Vavasor Powell, Welsh minister (b. 1617)
 1674 – Hallgrímur Pétursson, Icelandic minister and poet (b. 1614)
 1675 – Gilles de Roberval, French mathematician and academic (b. 1602)
 1789 – John Cook, American farmer and politician, 6th Governor of Delaware (b. 1730)
 1812 – Isaac Brock, British army officer and administrator, Lieutenant Governor of Upper Canada (b. 1769)
 1816 – Santō Kyōden, Japanese poet and painter (b. 1761)
 1880 – Thrasyvoulos Zaimis, Greek soldier and politician, 48th Prime Minister of Greece (b. 1822)

1901–present
 1917 – Arthur Rhys-Davids, English lieutenant and pilot (b. 1897)
 1926 – Warren Wood, American golfer and soldier (b. 1887)
 1927 – Squizzy Taylor, Australian gangster (b. 1888)
 1929 – Théodore Tuffier, French surgeon (b. 1857)
 1930 – Ellen Hayes, American mathematician and astronomer (b. 1851)
 1935 – Ernest Eldridge, English race car driver (b. 1897)
 1942 – Helmuth Hübener, German activist (b. 1925)
 1944 – Judith Auer, German World War II resistance fighter (b. 1905)
 1947 – William Fay, Irish actor and producer, co-founded the Abbey Theatre (b. 1872)
 1949 – Marcel Cerdan, Algerian-French boxer (b. 1916)
 1953 – Thomas Wass, English cricketer (b. 1873)
 1957 – James McGirr, Australian politician, 28th Premier of New South Wales (b. 1890)
 1962 – Rudolf Anderson, American soldier and pilot (b. 1927)
  1962   – Enrico Mattei, Italian businessman and politician (b. 1906)
 1968 – Lise Meitner, Austrian-English physicist and academic (b. 1878)
 1974 – C. P. Ramanujam, Indian mathematician and academic (b. 1938)
 1975 – Rex Stout, American detective novelist (b. 1886)
 1977 – James M. Cain, American journalist and author (b. 1892)
 1980 – Judy LaMarsh, Canadian soldier, lawyer, and politician, 42nd Secretary of State for Canada (b. 1924)
  1980   – John Hasbrouck Van Vleck, American physicist and mathematician, Nobel Prize laureate (b. 1899)
 1982 – Miguel Ydígoras Fuentes, President of Guatemala (1958 - 1963) (b. 1895)
 1988 – Charles Hawtrey, English actor, singer, and pianist (b. 1914)
 1990 – Xavier Cugat, Spanish-American violinist, bandleader, and actor (b. 1900)
  1990   – Jacques Demy, French actor, singer, director, and screenwriter (b. 1931)
  1990   – Elliott Roosevelt, American general and author (b. 1910)
  1990   – Ugo Tognazzi, Italian actor, director, and screenwriter (b. 1922)
 1991 – George Barker, English author and poet (b. 1913)
 1992 – David Bohm, American-English physicist and philosopher (b. 1917)
  1992   – Allen R. Schindler, Jr. American sailor (b. 1969)
 1996 – Arthur Tremblay, Canadian lawyer and politician (b. 1917)
 1997 – Mahala Andrews, British vertebrae palaeontologist (b. 1939)
 1999 – Robert Mills, American physicist and academic (b. 1927)
  1999   – Charlotte Perriand, French architect and designer (b. 1903)
 2000 – Walter Berry (bass-baritone), Austrian lyric bass-baritone (b. 1929)
 2001 – Pradeep Kumar, Indian actor, director, and producer (b. 1925)
 2002 – Tom Dowd, American record producer and engineer (b. 1925)
  2002   – Valve Pormeister, Estonian architect (b. 1922)
 2003 – Rod Roddy, American game show announcer (b. 1937)
  2003   – Stephanie Tyrell, American songwriter and producer (b. 1949)
 2004 – Lester Lanin, American bandleader (b. 1907)
  2004   – Paulo Sérgio Oliveira da Silva, Brazilian footballer (b. 1974)
  2004   – Zdenko Runjić, Croatian songwriter and producer (b. 1942)
 2005 – Jerry Cooke, Ukrainian-American photographer and journalist (b. 1921)
 2006 – Jozsef Gregor, Hungarian opera singer (b. 1940)
  2006   – Reko Lundán, Finnish journalist and author (b. 1969)
  2006   – Marlin McKeever, American football player (b. 1940)
  2006   – Joe Niekro, American baseball player (b. 1944)
  2006   – Brad Will, American journalist and activist (b. 1970)
 2007 – Moira Lister, South African actress (b. 1923)
 2008 – Chris Bryant, English actor and screenwriter (b. 1936)
  2008   – Ray Ellis, American conductor and producer (b. 1923)
  2008   – Frank Nagai, Japanese singer (b. 1932)
  2008   – Roy Stewart, Jamaican-English actor and stuntman (b. 1925)
 2009 – John David Carson, American actor (b. 1952)
  2009   – August Coppola, American author and academic (b. 1934)
  2009   – David Shepherd, English cricketer and umpire (b. 1940)
 2010 – Néstor Kirchner, Argentinian lawyer and politician, 51st President of Argentina (b. 1950)
 2011 – James Hillman, American psychologist and author (b. 1926)
  2011   – Robert Pritzker, American businessman, co-founded Marmon Group (b. 1926)
 2012 – Terry Callier, American singer-songwriter and guitarist (b. 1945)
  2012   – Angelo Maria Cicolani, Italian engineer and politician (b. 1952)
  2012   – Regina Dourado, Brazilian actress (b. 1952)
  2012   – Hans Werner Henze, German composer and educator (b. 1926)
  2012   – Rodney S. Quinn, American colonel, pilot, and politician, 44th Secretary of State of Maine (b. 1923)
  2012   – Göran Stangertz, Swedish actor and director (b. 1944)
 2013 – Noel Davern, Irish lawyer and politician, Minister for Education and Skills (b. 1945)
  2013   – Leonard Herzenberg, American immunologist, geneticist, and academic (b. 1931)
  2013   – Luigi Magni, Italian director and screenwriter (b. 1928)
  2013   – Lou Reed, American singer-songwriter, guitarist, producer, and actor (b. 1942)
  2013   – Michael Wilkes, English general and politician, Lieutenant Governor of Jersey (b. 1940)
  2013   – Vinko Coce, Croatian opera and pop singer (b. 1954)
 2014 – Daniel Boulanger, French actor and screenwriter (b. 1922)
  2014   – Shin Hae-chul, South Korean singer-songwriter and producer (b. 1968)
  2014   – Starke Taylor, American soldier and politician, mayor of Dallas (b. 1922)
 2015 – Ayerdhal, French author (b. 1959)
  2015   – Ranjit Roy Chaudhury, Indian pharmacologist and academic (b. 1930)
  2015   – Betsy Drake, French-American actress and singer (b. 1923)
  2015   – Philip French, English journalist, critic, and producer (b. 1933)
 2016 – Takahito, Prince Mikasa, member of the Imperial Family of Japan (b. 1915) 
 2018 – Vichai Srivaddhanaprabha, chairman of Leicester City F.C (b. 1958)
 2019 – Abu Bakr al-Baghdadi, leader of the Islamic State of Iraq and the Levant (ISIL); suicide (b. 1971)

Holidays and observances
 Christian feast day:
 Abbán
 Abraham the Poor
 Frumentius (Roman Catholic Church)
 Gaudiosus of Naples
 Kaleb of Axum
 Namatius (Namace)
 Oran of Iona
 October 27 (Eastern Orthodox liturgics)
 Černová Tragedy Day (Slovakia)
 Flag Day (Greece)
 Independence Day (Saint Vincent and the Grenadines), celebrates the independence of Saint Vincent and the Grenadines from United Kingdom in 1979.
 Navy Day (United States) (unofficial, official date is October 13) 
 World Day for Audiovisual Heritage

References

External links

 
 
 

Days of the year
October